Ebbw Vale Hospital was a community hospital in Ebbw Vale, Wales. It was managed by the Aneurin Bevan University Health Board.

History
The hospital was established by the conversion of two houses (one belonging to the Ebbw Vale Steelworks manager and one belonging to the Steelworks surgeon) in 1900. It joined the National Health Service in 1948 and, following the successful development of community-based health services, closed as a public sector healthcare institution in 2005. It briefly reopened as a private hospital in April 2008, but after Ysbyty Aneurin Bevan became the main provider of healthcare in the area in October 2010, the hospital got into financial difficulties and ceased trading in May 2012.

References

Defunct hospitals in Wales
Hospital buildings completed in 1900
Hospitals in Blaenau Gwent